Union for Democracy and Social Progress can refer to:

 Union for Democracy and Social Progress (Burkina Faso)
 Union for Democracy and Social Progress (Democratic Republic of the Congo)
 Union for Democracy and Social Progress (Niger)
 Union for Democracy and Social Progress (Togo)